Willy Susilo  is an Australian cybersecurity scientist and cryptographer. He is a Distinguished Professor at the School of Computing and Information Technology, Faculty of Engineering and Information Sciences University of Wollongong, Australia.

Willy Susilo is a fellow of IEEE (Computer Society), IET, ACS, and AAIA. He is the director of Institute of Cybersecurity and Cryptology, School of Computing and Information Technology, University of Wollongong. Willy is an innovative educator and researcher. Currently, he is the Head of School of Computing and Information Technology at UOW (2015 - now). Prior to this role, he was awarded the prestigious Australian Research Council Future Fellowship in 2009. He was the former Head of School of Computer Science and Software Engineering (2009 - 2010) and the Deputy Director of ICT Research Institute at UOW (2006 - 2008).

He is currently serving as the Associate Editor of IEEE Transactions on Dependable and Secure Computing (TDSC) and has served an Associate Editor of IEEE Transactions on Information Forensics and Security (TIFS). He is the Editor-in-Chief of the Elsevier Computer Standards and Interface  and the Information journals. His research interest is cybersecurity and cryptography.

Willy obtained his PhD from the University of Wollongong in 2001. He has published more than 400 papers in journals and conference proceedings in cryptography and network security. He has served as the program committee member of several international conferences.

In 2016, he was awarded the "Researcher of the Year" at UOW, due to his research excellence and contributions. His work on the creation of short signature schemes has been well cited and it is part of the IETF draft.

Biography
Willy received his Bachelor degree from the Faculty of Engineering at Universitas Surabaya, Indonesia. He went to the University of Wollongong, Australia, to pursue his Master's and Ph.D. degrees.  He was awarded a Ph.D. degree in 2001 from the University of Wollongong, Australia.

Research
Willy Susilo's research is in the area of cybersecurity and cryptography. His primary research focus is to design solutions and cryptographic algorithms to contribute towards securing the cyberspace.

Publications and awards
Distinguished Professor Willy Susilo is author and co-author of over 400 research papers. His work in cryptography, computer-security, information-technology, cyber-security, and network-security. 
 2021, IET Fellow
 2021, IEEE Fellow
 2021, ACS Fellow
 2021, AAIA Fellow
 2020, "Vice Chancellor's Global Strategy Award"
 2019, "Vice-Chancellor's Award For Research Supervision"
 2016, "Vice Chancellor's Research Excellence Award for Researcher of the Year"

Books
 F. Guo, W. Susilo and Y. Mu. Introduction to Security Reduction. Springer, 2018. 
 K.C. Li, X. Chen, and W. Susilo. Advances in Cyber Security: Principles, Techniques, and Applications. Springer, 2019. 
 X. Chen, W. Susilo, and E. Bertino. Cyber Security Meets Machine Learning. Springer, 2021.

Professional Services
Willy Susilo is the Editor-in-Chief of two journals. He is also General and PC Co-chair of more than 20 different international conferences in cryptography and cybersecurity.

Editor-in-Chief
 Computers Standard and Interfaces (Elsevier)
 Information journal (MDPI)

Professional Membership
 Fellow of IET.
 Fellow of IEEE.
 Fellow of Asia-Pacific Artificial Intelligence Association (AAIA).
 Fellow of the Australian Computer Society (ACS).
 Member of the International Cryptographic Association Research (IACR).

References

External links
 University of Wollongong personal homepage
 DBLP
 Google Scholar: Willy Susilo

Australian computer scientists
Living people
Academic staff of the University of Wollongong
Year of birth missing (living people)